Respite may be:

 Respite (law), a delay in the imposition of sentence
 Respite care, planned or emergency temporary care provided to caregivers of a child or adult
 "Respite", a track from Undertale Soundtrack, 2015

See also